Sir Arthur John Dorman, 1st Baronet,  (8 August 1848 – 12 February 1931) was an important British .

Early life
He was born at Ashford in Kent the son of Charles Dorman and Emma Page and educated at Christ's Hospital, then situated in Newgate, London.

Career
He was sent, at the age of 22, by his family to work at a Stockton-on-Tees ironworks where a relative was a partner.  Dorman started as a puddler and rapidly progressed in his career.  In 1875, he went into partnership with Albert de Lande Long to acquire the West Marsh Ironworks in Middlesbrough. During the 1880s they exploited the new steelmaking technologies being introduced at that time including the use of Open hearth furnaces. Together they built a large industrial concern, Dorman Long, which by 1914 employed 20,000 people and during the World War I was a major supplier of shells.

In 1892 he stood his only time for Parliament, as the Conservative candidate for Cleveland, losing by 4.2% of the vote to Henry Fell Pease in a seat which leaned on all other occasions of that era very strongly to the latter's Liberal party – with strong support to members of the prominent, equally industrialist, Pease family.

Arthur Dorman was appointed a Knight Commander of the Order of the British Empire (KBE) in 1918 and created a baronet of Nunthorpe in the County of York on 21 July 1923.

Family

He married Clara Lockwood in 1873 and together they had four sons and three daughters. His youngest son George Lockwood Dorman was killed in the Second Boer War, and is commemorated in the Dorman Museum.

Sir Arthur Dorman died in 1931 at Grey Towers, his home in Nunthorpe near Middlesbrough.
His title was inherited by his eldest son Bedford Lockwood Dorman.

References

External links
Picture of Sir Arthur Dorman, 1st Baronet

1848 births
1931 deaths
People educated at Christ's Hospital
English industrialists
Baronets in the Baronetage of the United Kingdom
Knights Commander of the Order of the British Empire
Conservative Party (UK) parliamentary candidates
People from Ashford, Kent